Love Dive is the second single album by South Korean girl group Ive. The single album was released by Starship Entertainment on April 5, 2022, and contains two tracks, including the lead single of the same name. It debuted atop the weekly Gaon Album Chart and also topped the monthly Gaon chart for April 2022, selling 544,339 copies in that month.

Background and release
On March 15, 2022, Starship Entertainment announced Ive would be releasing their second single album titled Love Dive on April 5. Three days later, the track listing was released, with "Love Dive" confirmed as the lead single. On March 21, a promotional video titled "Dear Cupid" was released. On April 4, the music video teaser for "Love Dive" was released. The highlight medley video was also released on the same day.

Composition
The lead single "Love Dive" was described as a "dark modern" pop song with "addictive chorus and percussion sound" with lyrics that "reinterpret cupid of the new era planning to shine on the stage". The second track "Royal" was described as a dance-pop song with "groovy and funky house-type baseline" and "smooth and souful synth sound" that "gives the elegant and intense [vibe] of catwalk in a fashion show". The song's rap lyrics was contributed by member Gaeul and Rei.

Critical reception

Tássia Assis from NME gave Love Dive a 4 out of 5 star rating, describing the single "Love Dive" as "the definite, luxurious plunge", which despite being "more subdued" than the group's previous single album "Eleven", is a "chaebol crush" that matches the extravagance and confidence that defines IVE. Assis then describes the B-side "Royal" as "classy", stating that "not only do [Ive] look expensive, but they also sound expensive", setting the overall tone of the single album as alluring and enticing.

Commercial performance
Love Dive debuted at number one on the week 15 issue of South Korea's Gaon Album Chart for the period dated April 3–9, 2022, and went on to top the April monthly chart with 544,339 cumulative copies sold. Per the year-end Circle Album Chart, it was the 21st best-selling album of 2022, having sold 861,165 copies overall.

Track listing

Certifications and sales

Release history

References

Single albums
Ive (group) albums
Korean-language albums
Starship Entertainment albums